Wobbies World was an amusement park which operated from about 1980 to the late 1990s in the Melbourne suburb of Nunawading, Australia.

The park consisted of many custom-built attractions, most slow moving and aimed at very young children. The park had some characteristic modes of transport including a helicopter "Whirliebird" monorail circuit, mower motor driven 6 wheeler ATVs, a real Bell helicopter refurbished as a ground-mounted simulator, a "Splashdown" mini log ride, a mini-golf course, trampolines, a ball pit, several food and drink kiosks, a miniature train circuit, a miniature car circuit, four Melbourne W2 class trams and a large Vickers Viscount propeller plane fitted out as a movie-projector simulator. One of the Whirliebird helicopters now resides in the front yard of a private residence 

Despite memorable television advertisements over the decades, the park slowly deteriorated in the mid to late 1990s and had closed down by the end of the decade. Its demise has been linked to the high entrance fee for the time ($36 for a family of four in 1994) and the charging of separate fees to use some of the attractions.

A plant nursery and the Saxon Wood town house estate occupied the Springvale Road site, but the entrance gate (without road), concrete castle, bridges, a train station, the Birthday Room and the miniature golf course from the former amusement park still remained within the nursery.

In September 2012, the state government announced that a new Forest Hill police station was to be built on the site. The plant nursery had now closed.

The site is now the location of the new Forest Hill Police Station.

Pissweak World
The park was almost certainly being satirised by the Melbourne-based TV sketch comedy show The Late Show, in recurring sketches entitled Pissweak World, consisting of fictional low-budget TV commercials for various amusement parks under the Pissweak brand, which had a variety of disappointing rides and unimpressed patrons. The style of the satirical advertisements was reminiscent of the Wobbies World TV commercial, which did not have sophisticated production values.

See also
List of abandoned amusement parks

References

Amusement parks in Victoria (Australia)
1970 establishments in Australia
1999 disestablishments in Australia
Defunct amusement parks in Australia
History of Melbourne